"Godzilla (Main Theme)" is a musical theme written by Akira Ifukube for the 1954 film Godzilla. Originally intended to be associated with the Japanese Self Defense Forces featured in the film, it became the thematic leitmotif for the monster character Godzilla and the entire franchise.
Despite the track being titled as "Main Title" on the Godzilla soundtrack, fans and Toho executives know the track as the Main Godzilla Theme or the Godzilla (Main Theme) song.
The theme first appeared on the original Godzilla film and in later sequels was replaced by a new theme titled the Godzilla March.
The Godzilla (Main Theme) was re-used for the first time in Terror of Mechagodzilla, the final Godzilla film featuring the Showa era's continuity within the franchise.

Alterations 
As the theme was brought back in sequels, it was also altered to fit in with the tone of the film. When it was brought back in Terror of Mechagodzilla, the main title from the film was mixed with the theme song. 
The only two songs on the Terror of Mechagodzilla soundtrack that have the Godzilla Theme mixed with the main titles are "The Appearance of Godzilla", "Godzilla vs. The Mega-Monster Tag-Team", and the "Main Title" itself.
On the Godzilla vs. Biollante and Godzilla vs. King Ghidorah Soundtrack, the tracks "Begin The Attack!" and "Godzilla vs. King Ghidorah" are actually the "Godzilla Theme", but they are not altered in any way.
On the Godzilla vs. King Ghidorah Soundtrack, the track "Godzilla's Resurrection" is a mixture of the Godzilla Theme and the Godzilla March, the second official Godzilla theme.
The ending title track from Godzilla vs. Destoroyah is the "Godzilla Theme" song with mixed excerpts from the King Kong vs. Godzilla soundtrack.
Keith Emerson arranged the track for the Godzilla: Final Wars soundtrack, keeping the track titled as "Godzilla (Main Theme)".

Bear McCreary arranged the track for the Godzilla: King of the Monsters soundtrack, keeping the track titled as "Godzilla Main Title" in addition to using it throughout the film as a theme for the titular character, incorporating kakegoe shouts from twenty-five taiko performers into the mix to represent the monster's strength and heroism in the film's story. Kan Sawada arranged the track for the Godzilla Singular Point.

See also
Godzilla March
Godzilla (Blue Öyster Cult song)
Godzilla (Eminem song)

References

External links

Godzilla (franchise)
Songs written for films
Film theme songs
Songs about fictional male characters
1954 compositions
1950s instrumentals